In mathematics, a flip graph is a graph whose vertices are combinatorial or geometric objects, and whose edges link two of these objects when they can be obtained from one another by an elementary operation called a flip. Flip graphs are special cases of geometric graphs.

Among noticeable flip graphs, one finds the 1-skeleton of polytopes such as associahedra or cyclohedra.

Examples 

A prototypical flip graph is that of a convex -gon . In this case, the flip operation consists in exchanging the diagonals of a convex quadrilateral. These diagonals are the interior edges by which two triangulations adjacent in the flip graph differ. The resulting flip graph is both the Hasse diagram of the Tamari lattice and the 1-skeleton of the -dimensional associahedron.

This basic construction can be generalized in a number of ways.

Finite sets of points in Euclidean space 

Let  be a triangulation of a finite set of points . This operation consists in modifying the way  triangulates a circuit (a minimally affinely dependent subset of ).

 

Topological surfaces 

Another kind of flip graphs is obtained by considering the triangulations of a topological surface: consider such a surface , place a finite number  of points on it, and connect them by arcs in such a way that any two arcs never cross. When this set of arcs is maximal, it decomposes  into triangles.

In this setting, two triangulations of  that can be obtained from one another by a continuous transformation are identical.

Two triangulations are related by a flip when they differ by exactly one of the arcs they are composed of. Note that, these two triangulations necessarily have the same number of vertices. This definition can be straightforwardly extended to bordered topological surfaces.
 
The flip graph of a surface generalises that of a -gon, as the two coincide when the surface is a topological disk with  points placed on its boundary.

Other flip graphs 

A number of other flip graphs can be defined using alternative definitions of a triangulation. For instance, the flip graph whose vertices are the centrally-symmetric triangulations of a -gon and whose edges correspond to the operation of doing two centrally-symmetric flips is the 1-skeleton of the -dimensional cyclohedron. One can also consider an alternative flip graph of a topological surface, defined by allowing multiple arcs and loops in the triangulations of this surface.

Flip graphs may also be defined using combinatorial objects other than triangulations. An example of such combinatorial objects are the domino tilings of a given region in the plane. In this case, a flip can be performed when two adjacent dominos cover a square: it consists in rotating these dominos by 90 degrees around the center of the square, resulting in a different domino tiling of the same region.

Properties

Polytopality 

Apart from associahedra and cyclohedra, a number of polytopes have the property that their 1-skeleton is a flip graph.

Connectedness 

Polytopal flip graphs are, by this property, connected. As shown by Klaus Wagner in the 1930s, the flip graph of the topological sphere is connected. Among the connected flip graphs, one also finds the flip graphs of any finite 2-dimensional set of points. In higher dimensional Euclidean spaces, the situation is much more complicated.

The flip graph of the vertex set of the 4-dimensional  hypercube is known to be connected. However, it is yet unknown whether the flip graphs of finite 3- and 4-dimensional sets of points are always connected or not.

References 

Application-specific graphs
Geometric graph theory